Pyrgocythara emersoni is a species of sea snail, a marine gastropod mollusk in the family Mangeliidae.

Description

Distribution
This species occurs in the Pacific Ocean off Mexico

References

External links
 American Museum of Natural History: Pyrgocythara emersoni

emersoni
Gastropods described in 1971